Raymond "Lavern" Roach (February 22, 1925 – February 23, 1950) was a boxer from the small Texas town of Plainview, who was Ring Magazine's Rookie-of-the-Year in 1947.  Lavern had a winning record and was considered an up-and-coming contender until his untimely death.  Lavern sustained a fatal head injury during a boxing match and died the next day due to a subdural hemorrhage.  He was the first boxing casualty of 1950.

Personal life
Born in the Cousins community just north of Plainview to loving parents Stanley James and Rosa Inez Roach, Lavern, along with his younger brother Bill, and sister Beth, were born athletes from the beginning. Lavern was a high school football star and an outstanding golfer. In 1947 he married his high school sweetheart Evelyn Joyce Ogden and raised their two children, daughter Ronnie Mac and son Richard James.

Boxing career
Roach first laced on a pair of gloves at the age of 10. At the age of 13, Roach answered the challenge at a county fair in Memphis, Texas, stepping into a makeshift ring against another youngster billed as an outstanding fighter. Roach tangled his way to a hard-fought, and very unofficial, draw, and his career path seemed all but set. He became a proficient boxer in high school and turned professional while still serving in the United States Marines. Twice Roach reached the state Golden Gloves title match, falling short of a crown, but went on to win a national Golden Gloves title after joining the Marines in 1943. At Cherry Point S.C., his boxing skills were recognized to the point where he was assigned a berth on the Marine boxing team. While boxing in the Marines he was chosen, Best Fighter of World War II, by Major John Abood. In November 1945 Roach turned pro under the management of John Abood. During the next five years, Roach's career took off as he won 23 of his 24 fights and built an 18-fight win streak.
As a professional, Roach rolled to enough victories to be named boxing's 1947 rookie of the year by Nat Fleischer of Ring Magazine. He then hit the big time when he defeated Tony Janiro in the main event at Madison Square Garden on January 16, 1948. Roach was given little chance against the more experienced Janiro but Roach was in impeccable shape and picked apart Janiro in a lopsided victory by winning 9 of 10 rounds. Just two months later he was back at Madison Square Garden for the biggest fight of his life - a title match against the European middleweight champion Marcel Cerdan. Although Roach won the first round, the 32-year-old Cerdan pummeled Roach to a knockout victory, knocking him down three times in the second round and four times in the eighth before a crowd of almost 17,000. Roach suffered his first loss in nearly two years which put an end to his 18-fight winning streak. Roach then retired from boxing for some 18 months before launching an ill-fated comeback.

Comeback and death
After a short retirement Roach was back in the ring. After a few easy wins Roach was scheduled to fight an exhibition bout on his 25th birthday against Georgie Small at the St. Nicholas Arena in Manhattan just two weeks before his scheduled fight against Sugar Ray Robinson. For seven rounds, Roach fought rings around Small. Roach was so far ahead on points that he could not help winning, but in the eighth round Small let go a desperation right and it crashed flush on Roach's jaw. Roach's legs buckled; staggering, slack-jawed and glassy-eyed, he hung on. When the bell sounded for the tenth round Roach doggedly came out into the ring again. Small jabbed a soggy left to his mouth then a vicious right put Roach down for a count of nine but Roach wouldn't stay down. The referee had a quick look at Roach and resumed the fight but after just one quick jab to the face by Small, Roach was down for the count. Roach muttered thickly. "I'm getting up." But it took two men to help get him back to his corner. Subconsciously, Lavern Roach seemed to know what was happening, saying "I'm all right," but then quickly lapsed into a coma. Fourteen hours later, in nearby St. Clare's Hospital, Lavern Roach, 25, died of a brain hemorrhage at 12:50 pm. Only a small audience of 1,832 waded through sleet and snow to see the middleweight battle in the ancient midtown club, but hundreds of thousands of shocked television viewers saw the tragic ending of the fight over the CBS network telecast. He was the first boxing casualty of 1950 and one of the first boxers ever to suffer a fatal blow live on national television.

Then and now
The Lavern Roach memorial service was held on February 27, 1950, in Millburn, New Jersey, in front of hundreds of friends and family, including Georgie Small who broke down in tears during the reception after apologizing to Lavern's widow. Roach's Pastor Romaine F. Bateman's eulogy stated, "Few Men in New York have ever had so many friends. Once you knew Lavern you always felt you gained a friend." Thousands more bowed in grief as they read what had happened in the newspapers. Roach's body was then transported back to his home town of Plainview, Texas, by military escort where his closest friends and family laid him to rest in the Roach family plot at Plainview Cemetery.  

In his home town of Plainview, the Lavern Roach Memorial Award, is given as the highest honor bestowed upon a senior male student at Plainview High School by popular vote of the student body. It was established in April 1950 by his widow, Evelyn Roach, to promote clean living, good citizenship and sportsmanship. Through the years, the award has been given by his surviving family members including; his brother Bill, sister Beth, widow Evelyn, daughter Ronnie, son Richard, and three grandsons James, Kris, and Kyler Roach.

Roach was recognized as one of the top 100 athletes of the century in the South Plains.

Fight record

Record to Date
Won 26 (KOs 11)  Lost 5  Drawn 0  Total 31

External links
Article in Time Magazine

eastsideboxing.com article 
Newspaper Article

1925 births
1950 deaths
Plainview High School (Texas) alumni
Deaths due to injuries sustained in boxing
Middleweight boxers
Boxers from Texas
People from Plainview, Texas
Sports deaths in New York (state)
American male boxers